Patrick da Silva Ferreira Souza (born 28 February 2000), commonly known as Patrick, is a Brazilian footballer who currently plays as a defender for Bangu.

Career

Flamengo

FC Midtjylland (loan)
On 31 January 2019, Danish Superliga club FC Midtjylland confirmed, that they had signed Patrick on a 18-month loan deal with an option to buy.

Career statistics

Club

References

2000 births
Living people
Brazilian footballers
Brazil youth international footballers
Association football defenders
CR Flamengo footballers
FC Midtjylland players
Danish Superliga players
Footballers from Rio de Janeiro (city)